Priest Mine is an abandoned surface and underground mine in Northeastern Ontario, Canada. Dating back to the early 1900s, it is one of the oldest mines in the municipality of Temagami.

History
The mine was discovered in 1907 when attention was focused there by the discovery of a quartz vein in rocks that closely resembled those in the town of Cobalt further north, which was undergoing a silver rush at the time. Development consisted of small open pits and sinking of a  inclined shaft along the quartz vein. Small shipments of sulfide ore, containing copper and lead with some gold and silver values, were made to a smelter.

In 1955, Cross Lake Mining Company Limited dewatered the shaft for examination and four diamond drill holes were created from the surface. It was evident that good mineralization had been encountered in the shaft, judging from the lumps of high-grade ore found lying in the muck, consisting of copper and galena, and some was observed on the waste rock dump. Heavy mineralization of pyrite, chalcopyrite and galena was noted at two points at the bottom of the shaft.

See also
List of mines in Temagami

References

External links

Mines in Temagami
Surface mines in Canada
Underground mines in Canada
Copper mines in Ontario
Gold mines in Ontario
Lead mines in Canada
Silver mines in Canada